Elmira Forner (born February 26, 1941) is a Canadian-born American politician who served in the Washington House of Representatives from the 47th district from 1990 to 1995.

References

External links 
 Elmira Forner at ourcampaigns.com

1941 births
Living people
Republican Party members of the Washington House of Representatives
Women state legislators in Washington (state)